LJ may refer to:

Arts and media 
L. J. Burrows, a fictional character on the TV series Prison Break
Lemon Jelly, a British electronica duo
Library Journal, an American trade publication for librarians
Linux Journal, an American monthly technology magazine
LiveJournal, a Russian social networking service

Businesses and organizations 
LJ Air, a Chinese airline
Jin Air, a South Korean airline (IATA code LJ)
Lashkar i Jhangvi, a Muslim terrorist organization

People 
L. J. F. Brimble (1904–1965), English botanist
L. J. Castile (born 1987), American football player
L. J. Collier (born 1995), American football player
L. J. Cooke (1868–1943), American basketball coach
LJ Cryer (born 2001), American basketball player
L. J. C. Daniels (1858–1949), American political activist
L. J. Davis (1940–2011), American writer
L. J. Fellenz (1882–1941), American politician
L. J. Figueroa (born 1998), Dominican-American basketball player
L. J. Foret (1930–2002), American musician
L. J. Forman (1855–1933), American politician
L. J. Fort (born 1990), American basketball player
L. J. Greenberg (1861–1931), British journalist
L. J. Hanifan (1879–1932), American economist
L. J. Hepp (born 1978), American basketball coach
L. J. Hoes (born 1990), American baseball player
L. J. Jenkins (born 1987), American cowboy
L. J. Maxwell (1851–??), American politician
L. J. Mazzilli (born 1990), American baseball player
L. J. McCray (born 1991), American football player
L. J. Peak (born 1996), American basketball player
LJ Reyes (born 1987), Filipino actress
L. J. Roberts (born 1980), American textile artist
L. J. Seneviratne (1899–??), Sri Lankan civil servant
L. J. K. Setright (1931–2005), English journalist
L. J. Sevin (1930–2015), American venture capitalist
L. J. Shelton (born 1976), American football player
L. J. Smith (born 1980), American football player
L. J. Smith (author) (born 1965), American author
L. J. van Zyl (born 1985), South African athlete
Larry Johnson (basketball, born 1969), American basketball player 
Lawrence Jackson (born 1985), American football player

Places 
La Jolla, California
Ljubljana, the capital of Slovenia

Science and technology 
 System LJ, Gentzen's sequent calculus for intuitionist logic
 LaserJet, a printer brand name
 Lennard-Jones potential, a function used in chemical physics
 Lightweight Java, a programming language

Other uses
ǈ (digraph), a digraph used in some Slavic languages
Lord Justice of Appeal

See also 
Lje, a letter of the Cyrillic script